Orrock is an unincorporated community in Orrock Township, Sherburne County, Minnesota, United States.

Geography
The community is near the junction of Sherburne County Road 5 (184th Street NW) and Sherburne County Road 4. County Roads 1, 15, 16, and 75 are also in the immediate area.

Nearby towns include Big Lake, Becker, Santiago, Zimmerman, and Elk River. The Sherburne National Wildlife Refuge and the Sand Dunes State Forest are both in the surrounding area.

References

Unincorporated communities in Minnesota
Unincorporated communities in Sherburne County, Minnesota